Mount Gaash was the name of a hill in ancient Israel, in the mountainous region of Ephraim, mentioned several times in the Hebrew Bible. It is mentioned as a place of torrent valleys, which may refer to ravines in the vicinity:

Joshua son of Nun was buried in the hill country of Ephraim, which was north of Mount Gaash.
Hurai from the "Ravines of Gaash" participated as one of David's Mighty Warriors in conquering the City of David.

References 

Hebrew Bible mountains